Roger Vincent Hardy (born November 11, 1969) is a Canadian Internet entrepreneur and businessman. He is the Chairman, and CEO of Hardy Capital. Hardy is also the co-founder and former Chairman, and CEO of Coastal Contacts Inc. (TSX: COA, NASDAQ: COA), the leading manufacturer and online retailer of eyewear products. The Coastal Contacts Inc.’s family of websites includes Coastal.com, ClearlyContacts.ca, Clearly.com.au, Clearly.co.nz, Lensway.co.uk and ContactSan.com.

Early and personal life 

Hardy was born in Toronto, Ontario and grew up in Eastern Canada where he attended Earl of March Secondary School. After graduating from Bishops University, Hardy’s passion for skiing pulled him to the West Coast. He spent a year skiing in Whistler and came to the decision that BC was his home.

While attending university, Hardy was a member of many sports teams where his competitive nature garnered him the Most Valuable Player of the year award. Later in his career, it was this competitive spirit that helped Hardy succeed in an online industry in which thousands had entered, and failed.

Hardy currently resides in Vancouver, British Columbia with his wife and children.

Career

Coastal Contacts Inc. 

Hardy first worked for a transportation and logistics company, followed by a contact lens company. While working at the contact lens company, Hardy recognized that purchasing contact lenses was expensive, time consuming and service constrained for consumers.

In 2000, Hardy founded Coastal Contacts Inc. The Company started in a basement office with one phone line, a 14K modem, a ping pong table and a Visa card. Hardy purchased the keyword “contact lens” from AltaVista and Snap.com. This keyword was not known to have any value at the time and no other companies were advertising on the keyword. Hardy bought the exclusive rights to “contact lenses” and launched with that advertising. In the first day, they had 30 orders; within the first month, they had $68,000 in sales.

Under Hardy’s direction, Coastal Contacts Inc. became the world’s largest online retailer for eyewear. In 2001, Coastal achieved $1 million in cumulative revenue. In 2004, the Company began trading on TSX. In 2008, the Company launched eyeglasses business unit. In 2012, Coastal surpasses $1 billion in cumulative sales since 2000 and starts trading on NASDAQ.

Coastal Contacts Inc. and Essilor signed an agreement on February 27, 2014 that it is acquiring Coastal Contacts Inc. for C$430 million.

510 Seymour Street, Vancouver

In 2014 Hardy funded and acquired in a well-publicized acquisition a development property at 510 Seymour Street in Vancouver B.C. This unique distressed property located on the edge of the downtown core represented an opportunity to build an iconic statement building and plant a flag in Vancouver's downtown core; one of the world's fastest rising markets. The building was completed in January 2017 having experienced tremendous appreciation in land and improvements.  510 Seymour Street located at the corner of West Pender and Seymour St is a modern 82,000 sq. ft masterpiece. Hardy Capital now occupies the penthouse of this iconic Vancouver property.

B.C.'s Living Legends 
Roger was recognized as one of B.C.'s most influential business leaders and featured as one of 13 Living Legends who have made a profound impact on B.C.'s communities, industries and economy. We're inspired everyday by Roger's innovative spirit, commitment to give back to his community, and his desire to develop future purpose-driven leaders.

Awards 
In 2002, Hardy was recognized as Top 40 under 40 Award by Business in Vancouver. 
In 2006, Hardy was awarded the Ernst & Young Entrepreneur of the Year Award (Business to Consumer). In 2016, Hardy was again awarded the Ernst & Young Entrepreneur of the Year Award (Business to Consumer).
In 2009, Hardy received Bishop’s University Top 10 After 10 Award in 2009.

Philanthropy

Hardy Family Foundation

The Hardy Family Foundation was formed shortly after the sale of Coastal Contacts with an endowment of $3 million dollars. The goal of the foundation is to give back to the community and institutions that have supported the Hardy Family through the creation and growth of Coastal Contacts. Philanthropic contributions have been made in areas of Mental Health, education, Police foundation work, Cancer, and children's advancement.

Hardy Endowment Fund

Hardy established the Hardy Endowment Fund at Bishops University which will pay the tuition for a student "in need" each year in perpetuity. This fund has grown substantially and now funds many students academic pursuits.  Hardy is responsible for donating to and contributing countless hours along with his team at Coastal Contacts Inc. over the past years to charities close to their hearts. Easter Seals, The Ride to Conquer Cancer, The Greater Vancouver Food Bank, ORBIS Canada and The Red Cross are some of the many charities that he is involved with. 
Hardy has also contributed more than 1 million pairs of free glasses to people in developing countries such as Mexico, El Salvador and Kenya, as well as disadvantaged people in Canada through Coastal Contacts Inc.’s own charity project, Change the View, which was founded by Hardys wife Jenny.

References

External links
 Coastal Contacts "Coastal.com to Launch Proprietary Eyeglasses Line Compatible with Wearable Technology" 2014.
 Coastal Contacts "Coastal.com Launches New Approach to Revolutionary Home Trial Program for Prescription Eyewear" 2014.

1969 births
Living people
Canadian businesspeople
Eyewear people